Dot pitch (sometimes called line pitch, stripe pitch, or phosphor pitch) is a specification for a computer display, computer printer, image scanner, or other pixel-based devices that describe the distance, for example, between dots (sub-pixels) on a display screen. In the case of an RGB color display, the derived unit of pixel pitch is a measure of the size of a triad plus the distance between triads.	

Dot pitch may be measured in linear units (with smaller numbers meaning higher resolution), usually millimeters (mm), or as a rate, for example, dots per inch (with a larger number meaning higher resolution). Closer spacing produces a sharper image (as there are more dots in a given area). However, other factors may affect image quality, including:	
 Undocumented or inadequately documented measurement method, complicated by ignorance of the existence of different methods
 Confusion of pixels and subpixels
 Element spacing varying across screen area (e.g., widening in corners compared to center)
 Differing pixel geometries
 Differing image and pixel aspect ratios
 Miscellanea such as Kell factor or interlaced video

The exact difference between horizontal and diagonal dot pitch varies with the design of the monitor (see pixel geometry and widescreen), but a typical entry-level 0.28 mm (diagonal) monitor has a horizontal pitch of 0.24 or 0.25 mm, and a good quality 0.26 mm (diagonal) unit has a horizontal pitch of 0.22 mm.

The above dot pitch measurement does not apply to aperture grille displays. Such monitors use continuous vertical phosphor bands on the screen, so the vertical distance between scan lines is limited only by the video input signal's vertical resolution and the thickness of the electron beam, so there is no vertical 'dot pitch' on such devices. Aperture grille only has horizontal 'dot pitch', or otherwise known as 'stripe pitch'.

Common dot pitch sizes

External links
 PPI calculator – Shows dot pitch
 Pixels Per Inch PPI Calculator – Determines the number of pixels per inch of your display
 Megapixel Calculator – Identifies aspect ratio and displays photo and video storage requirements for different formats at a given megapixel number

Length
Television technology